Lois J. Schiffer (born February 22, 1945) is an American attorney who served as the United States Assistant Attorney General for the Environment and Natural Resources from 1993 to 2001.

References

1945 births
Living people
United States Assistant Attorneys General for the Environment and Natural Resources Division
Clinton administration personnel
American women lawyers
21st-century American women